Amphimallon keithi is a species of beetle in the Melolonthinae subfamily that is endemic to Turkey.

References

Beetles described in 2002
keithi
Endemic fauna of Turkey
Beetles of Europe